Maria Goranova (Bulgarian: Мария Горанова) is professor of management at the University of Wisconsin Milwaukee. She conducts research on shareholder empowerment and activism, corporate governance, and corporate strategy. She serves as editor of Corporate Governance: An International Review, and on the editorial board of Journal of Management, and is a member of the Academy of Management, International Association for Business and Society, and Strategic Management Society. Her research has been published in a number of leading journals including Strategic Management Journal, Journal of Management Studies, Organization Science, Journal of Management, Academy of Management Perspectives, Journal of Business Research, and Academy of Management Proceedings. She is also recipient of Distinguished Paper and Best Reviewer Awards from the Academy of Management.

Early life and education 
Born in Sofia, Bulgaria, Maria Goranova studied at Sofia University. She finished her MBA in 1998 after receiving Tempus award by the European Union to study in  France at the Université des Sciences et Technologies de Lille. She received a doctorate in business administration from Syracuse University in 2007.

Professional career 
Her research is at the intersection of corporate governance, shareholder empowerment, and strategy, examining the implications of corporate governance for strategic issues such as mergers and acquisitions and corporate diversification. She is also studying shareholder activism and executive compensation issues.
Prior to joining academia she worked for FPBank, TMF Services, and as chief accountant for SIAD BG, Praxair. She joined University of Wisconsin Milwaukee faculty in 2007 and became an associate professor in 2013.

Publications 
 Goranova M., & Ryan L. (Eds.) 2015. Shareholder Empowerment: A New Era in Corporate Governance. New York:  Palgrave-Macmillan. 
 Goranova M., Abouk R., Nystrom P., Soofi E. 2015. Corporate governance antecedents to shareholder activism: A zero-inflated process 
 Hou W., Priem R., Goranova M. 2014. Does One Size Fit All? Investigating Pay–Future Performance Relationships Over the "Seasons" of CEO Tenure.
 
 
 
 
 
 Goranova M., Dharwadkar R., Brandes P. 2008. Owners on Both Sides of the Deal: Mergers and Acquisitions and Overlapping Institutional Ownership, Academy of Management Best Paper Proceedings, 2008

References

External links 
Maria Goranova UWM page
Maria Goranova CV

Living people
Sofia University alumni
Syracuse University alumni
University of Wisconsin–Milwaukee faculty
Bulgarian emigrants to the United States
Year of birth missing (living people)